This is a comprehensive list of songs by Pakistani progressive rock band Mizraab. The band have released two studio albums, as well as numerous live albums, singles, and music videos. This list does not contain live versions or remixes.

Original songs

Other songs

Cover versions

External links
Mizraabianz.com - Official Website
Mizraab discography at Official Website

Songs
Mizraab